Cetanoviće is a village in the municipality of Sjenica, Serbia. At the 2002 census, the village had a population of 386 people.

References

Populated places in Zlatibor District